Adrien Fidele Tameze Aoutsa (born 4 February 1994) is a professional footballer who plays as a midfielder for  club Hellas Verona.

Born in France to Cameroonian parents, Tameze represented his native country at youth level. In 2018, he was called up to play for the Cameroon national team.

Club career
On 31 January 2020, Tameze joined Italian Serie A club Atalanta on loan with an option to purchase. On 3 September 2020, he signed to Hellas Verona until 30 June 2024.

International career
After having represented France at youth levels, Tameze accepted a call to play for Cameroon in August 2018 as he was eligible through his parents.

References

External links

 
 
 

1994 births
Living people
Footballers from Lille
French sportspeople of Cameroonian descent
French footballers
Cameroonian footballers
Association football midfielders
Valenciennes FC players
OGC Nice players
Atalanta B.C. players
Hellas Verona F.C. players
Ligue 1 players
Ligue 2 players
Serie A players
France youth international footballers
French expatriate footballers
French expatriate sportspeople in Italy
Cameroonian expatriate footballers
Cameroonian expatriate sportspeople in Italy
Expatriate footballers in Italy
Black French sportspeople